No Time Left is an album by American jazz saxophonist Chico Freeman recorded in 1979 for the Italian Black Saint label.

Reception
The Allmusic review by Scott Yanow awarded the album 3 stars stating "Freeman's warm tone and knowledge of more traditional areas of jazz make even his more abstract flights seem fairly accessible".

Track listing
All compositions by Chico Freeman
 "No Time Left" - 17:49
 "Uhmla" - 12:26
 "Circle" - 5:14

Production
Recorded at Fontana Studios in Milano, Italy on June 8 & 9, 1979

Personnel
Chico Freeman - tenor saxophone, soprano saxophone, bass clarinet
Jay Hoggard - vibes
Rick Rozie - bass
Famoudou Don Moye - drums

References 

Black Saint/Soul Note albums
Chico Freeman albums
1979 albums